Around the city of Póvoa de Varzim in Portugal there are many dependent settlements or hamlets dispersed in the civil parishes. These parishes have dispersed settlement, with small clusters that are called Lugares (literally, Places) or Localidades (localities) in Portugal, these hamlets are also known as villages (aldeias) and most of the municipal territory and beyond is actually continuous, in urban terms, with the city in the highways that link it to neighbouring cities such as Barcelos, Famalicão or Esposende, the same occurs to the South, and several of these hamlets are suburbs with a number of separate farmsteads scattered throughout the area.

History
Póvoa de Varzim suburbs were differentiated into two: Arrabaldes (outskirts) and aldeias (villages).  The Arrabaldes were located just off the town core and by the main streets, and were part of the urban area,  including places such as the Old Town of Póvoa de Varzim (Vila Velha), Regufe, or Giesteira. The aldeias were located farther apart. In 1758, the lieutenant of Póvoa fortress, Veiga Leal, tell them apart using small gunshots: if closer, it was an Arrabalde, if away an Aldeia. Although the inhabitants of more distant suburbs would not go to the town center to work, they depended on it as their service center and marketplace, to buy and sell their goods. The town also depended on its periphery for workers, food, water and raw materials.

Already in the 16th century and especially in the 17th some new suburbs started to appear. In 1736, four outskirts were named: Vila Velha, Giesteira, Casal do Monte, and Regufe. In 1758, the number increased to 7, with Gandra, Coelheiro, and Moninhas. In 1763, there were 10 and in 1832, 12. Although this list may be inaccurate, as several other outskirts were known to exist at the time.

List
As of 2011 Census, Póvoa de Varzim includes 99 localities, including the city and many hamlets, several of which are city outskirts, part of the suburban sprawl, small villages also remain.

References